Bruno Gonçalves may refer to:

 Bruno Gonçalves (footballer, born 1994), Brazilian footballer
 Bruno Gonçalves (footballer, born 2003), Brazilian footballer